Wrightsville is an unincorporated community in Adams County, in the U.S. state of Ohio.

History
Wrightsville was platted in 1847. The post office Wrightsville once contained was first called Mahala, then Vineyard Hill. The post office was established as Mahala in 1850, the name was changed to Vineyard Hill in 1857, and the post office closed in 1907.

References

Unincorporated communities in Adams County, Ohio
1847 establishments in Ohio
Populated places established in 1847
Unincorporated communities in Ohio